Villa Atamisqui is a municipality and village in Santiago del Estero in Argentina. It is the capital of the Atamisqui Department.

References

Populated places in Santiago del Estero Province